Erik Gideon Eriksson (12 June 1897 – 21 May 1975) was a Finnish hammer thrower. He competed at the 1924 and 1928 Olympics, finishing in fourth and ninth place, respectively. He achieved his personal best of a 50.36 m throw in 1931, but retired before the 1932 Olympics.

References

1897 births
1975 deaths
Athletes (track and field) at the 1924 Summer Olympics
Athletes (track and field) at the 1928 Summer Olympics
Olympic athletes of Finland
Finnish male hammer throwers
Sportspeople from Southwest Finland